Kahnweiler  is a surname. Notable people with the surname include: 

Daniel-Henry Kahnweiler (1884–1979), German-born art dealer and collector
Jessie Kahnweiler, American actress
Louis S. Kahnweiler (1919–2017), American real estate investor